The 1973 U.S. Clay Court Championships was a combined men's and women's tennis tournament held at the Woodstock Country Club in Indianapolis in the United States and played on outdoor clay courts. It was part of the men's Grand Prix and women's International Grand Prix. It was the fifth edition of the tournament and was held from August 13 through August 19, 1973. Second-seeded Manuel Orantes won the men's singles title and accompanying $16,000 prize money while Chris Evert took the women's title and the $6,000 first prize.

Finals

Men's singles
 Manuel Orantes defeated  Georges Goven 6–4, 6–1, 6–4
 It was Orantes' 4th title of the year and the 11th of his career.

Women's singles
 Chris Evert defeated  Veronica Burton 6–4, 6–3
 It was Evert's 9th title of the year and the 20th of her career.

Men's doubles
 Frew McMillan /  Bob Carmichael defeated  Manuel Orantes /  Ion Țiriac 6–3, 6–4

Women's doubles
 Patti Hogan /  Sharon Walsh defeated  Fiorella Bonicelli /  Isabel Fernández de Soto 6–4, 6–4

References

U.S. Clay Court Championships
U.S. Men's Clay Court Championships
U.S. Men's Clay Court Championships
U.S. Men's Clay Court Championships